NuStar Energy L.P. is a publicly traded master limited partnership. The company is one of the largest independent liquids terminal and pipeline operators in the nation. NuStar owns 8,700 miles of pipeline and 79 terminal and storage facilities that store and distribute crude oil, refined products and specialty liquids.

The partnership's combined system has approximately 93 million barrels of storage capacity, and NuStar has operations in the United States, Canada, Mexico, the Netherlands, including Sint Eustatius in the Caribbean, and the United Kingdom.

Operations are managed by NuStar GP, LLC. As of December 31, 2015, NuStar GP, LLC had 1,251 domestic employees and certain of their wholly owned subsidiaries had 393 employees performing services for their international operations.

In 2018 Inter Pipeline acquired NuStar Energy L.P.'s European bulk liquid storage business ("NuStar Europe") for cash consideration of US$270 million.

In 2019 NuStar received the first shipment of long haul Permian Crude at Corpus Christi terminal.

Crockett facility fire
On 15 October 2019, the Nustar Fire, a 15-acre wildfire, was caused by an explosion of two ethanol storage tanks at NuStar's Crockett, California, fuel depot.

See also
 William Greehey

References

Companies listed on the New York Stock Exchange
Oil companies of the United States
Oil pipeline companies
Companies based in San Antonio